The Commodore Commanding Submarines (West) is an operational appointment in the Indian Navy. The COMCOS (W) is the commander of the all submarines and allied units of Western Naval Command. Based in Mumbai, Maharashtra, the COMCOS is also the Commanding Officer of the submarine base INS Vajrabahu. Currently, there are two COMCOS in the Indian Navy, COMCOS (East) and COMCOS (West). The COMCOS (W) is a one star officer holding the rank of Commodore. The current COMCOS (W) is Commodore  Sriram Amur.

History
The submarine base INS Virbahu was commissioned on 19 May 1971 as the shore support base for submarines. The Commanding Officer of Virbahu functioned as the Captain of the submarine squadron and the class Authority for all submarines.

In the early 1970s, four Vela-class submarines were acquired. With this, the 9th submarine squadron was formed and was based on the west coast, in Mumbai. They constituted the 11th submarine squadron. Four more Sindhughosh-class submarines were to be commissioned constituting the 12th submarine squadron.

Since multiple submarine squadrons (SS) had been formed - the 8th and 11th SS in Visakhapatnam and 9th, 10th and 12th SS in Mumbai, the need to group them on each coast was felt. In April 1987, the post of Commodore Submarines West (COMSUB (W)) was created. On 1 February 1996, the submarine base on the west coast, INS Vajrabahu was commissioned in Mumbai. Later that year, the appointment of COMSUB was re-designated Commodore Commanding Submarines (COMCOS).

Organisation
Today, INS Vajrabahu, the 10th submarine squadron and the 11th submarine squadron come under the COMCOS(W). The COMCOS (W) is also the commanding officer of INS Vajrabahu.

See also
 Flag Officer Submarines
 Commodore Commanding Submarines (East)

References

Bibliography

Indian Navy
Indian military appointments
Indian Navy appointments